The Internet Protocol Version 4 address  can have multiple uses.

Official Standard Meaning and Use 
IANA, who allocate IP addresses globally, have allocated the single IP address  to  section 3.2.1.3.

It is named there as "This host on this network"

RFC 1122 refers to  using the notation {0,0}.  It prohibits this as a destination address in IPv4 and only allows it as a source address under specific circumstances.

A host may use  as its own source address in IP when it has not yet been assigned an address. Such as when sending the initial DHCPDISCOVER packet when using DHCP.

Internal Operating system Specific Uses 
Some operating systems have attributed special internal meaning to the address.  These uses do not result in IPv4 packets containing  and so are not necessarily governed by RFC 1122.  These meanings may not be consistent between OS.

In both Windows and Linux, when selecting which of a host's IP address to use as a source IP, a program may specify INADDR_ANY. 

In Linux a program may specify  as the remote address to connect to the current host (AKA localhost).

Other non-standard Uses 

Besides the use by operating systems internally, other uses have been attributed to the address with varying success 
 A non-routable meta-address used to designate an invalid, unknown or non applicable target
 The address a host assigns to itself when address request via DHCP has failed, provided the host's IP stack supports this. This usage has been replaced with the APIPA mechanism in modern operating systems.
 A way to explicitly specify that the target is unavailable.
A way to route a request to a nonexistent target instead of the original target. Often used for adblocking purposes.  This can conflict with OS specific behaviour.  For example use in DNS can cause Linux to connect to Localhost instead of nothing at all.

Routing 

In routing tables,  can also appear in the gateway column. This indicates that the gateway to reach the corresponding destination subnet is unspecified. This generally means that no intermediate routing hops are necessary because the system is directly connected to the destination.

This should not be confused with the CIDR notation  which defines an IP block containing all possible IP addresses.  It is commonly used in routing to depict the default route as a destination subnet. It matches all addresses in the IPv4 address space and is present on most hosts, directed towards a local router.

In IPv6 

The IPv6 variant serves the same purpose as its IPv4 counterpart.

See also
 Reserved IP addresses
 localhost

References

External links
 

Routing
IP addresses
0 (number)